João Miguel Ferreira Rodrigues (born 26 October 1994) known as João Tarzan, is a Portuguese professional footballer who plays for Caldas as a forward.

Football career
On 29 July 2018, Tarzan made his professional debut with Leixões in a 2018–19 Taça da Liga match against Feirense.

References

External links

1994 births
Living people
Portuguese footballers
Association football forwards
Segunda Divisão players
Primeira Liga players
Liga Portugal 2 players
Caldas S.C. players
Leixões S.C. players
Belenenses SAD players
Sportspeople from Leiria District